The giraffe is a fairy chess piece with an elongated knight move. It can jump four squares vertically and one square horizontally or four squares horizontally and one square vertically, regardless of intervening pieces; thus, it is a (1,4)-leaper.

Movement

History
According to H. J. R. Murray, the giraffe appears as a (1,4) leaper in Grande Acedrex; however, other sources describe a (2,3) movement pattern, similar to the zebra.

See also
 Camel (chess)
 Zebra (chess)

References

Fairy chess pieces